Tres Davis (born January 13, 1982) is a former professional tennis player from the United States.

Biography
Originally from Lubbock, Texas, Davis is the eldest of three brothers and was coached by his father Doug.

Tennis career
Most noted for his junior career, he was a Junior Davis Cup representative for the United States and a boys' doubles finalist at three grand slam tournaments. In all three finals he finished runner-up, at the 1999 US Open with Alberto Francis, 2000 Australian Open with Andy Roddick and 2000 US Open with Robby Ginepri. He also competed in the men's doubles draw with Ginepri at the 2000 US Open, where they lost a three set first round match to Argentines Pablo Albano and Lucas Arnold Ker.

After winning the Big 12 Conference Championship title with Texas A&M, Davis turned professional in 2002. He competed mostly in satellite tournaments and on the Challenger Tour. His only main draw appearance on the ATP Tour came at the 2005 U.S. Men's Clay Court Championships in Houston, where he formed a wildcard pairing with Andy Roddick, who would win the singles title. The pair made the doubles quarter-finals, by beating James Blake and Mardy Fish. He retired in 2006.

Life after tennis
Davis is the former travelling coach of Ryan Harrison and now runs a cleaning and restoration business with his wife Paige in the Greater Austin area.

Junior Grand Slam finals

Doubles: 3 (3 runner-ups)

ATP Challenger and ITF Futures Finals

Singles: 5 (1–4)

Doubles: 12 (9–3)

References

External links
 
 

1982 births
Living people
American male tennis players
Tennis people from Texas
Sportspeople from Lubbock, Texas
Texas A&M Aggies men's tennis players
American tennis coaches